Badeley is a surname. Notable people with the surname include:

 Cecil Badeley (1896–1986), New Zealand rugby footballer
 Edward Badeley (c1803–1868), English ecclesiastical lawyer 
 Henry Badeley, 1st Baron Badeley (1874–1951), English Baron and civil servant 
 John Carr Badeley (1794–1851), English medical doctor
 Sydney Badeley (1902–1981), New Zealand cricketer
 Victor Ivan Badeley (1898–1971), New Zealand rugby footballer

See also
Baddeley